Cycles is a studio album by American singer Frank Sinatra, released in 1968.

Released just before Christmas in 1968, there was a ten-month gap between the release of Francis A. & Edward K. and this album, which was the longest period in Sinatra's Reprise years in which he did not commercially record music (barring his contributions to The Sinatra Family Wish You a Merry Christmas).

Sinatra sang a variety of folk-rock oriented songs, including Judy Collins' hit "Both Sides Now" (written by Joni Mitchell) and the Glen Campbell hits "Gentle on My Mind" (written by John Hartford) and "By the Time I Get to Phoenix" (written by Jimmy Webb). The title song was released as a single, reaching #23 on the Billboard Hot 100 chart and #2 on the Easy Listening chart, while the album peaked at #18 on the Billboard 200 chart.

Production
Cycles was recorded in Los Angeles during one session that lasted three hours from 8 p.m. to 11 p.m. During the session, 25 people including George Harrison, Patty Boyd, and Tiny Tim came and visited Sinatra.

As seen on the front cover, the song "Wait by the Fire" by Al Gorgoni and Chip Taylor and was supposed to appear on the album, but Sinatra scrapped the song and substituted it for "My Way of Life" after the cover had already been printed.

Track listing
"Rain in My Heart" (Teddy Randazzo, Victoria Pike)  – 3:20
"From Both Sides, Now" (Joni Mitchell)  – 2:55
"Little Green Apples" (Bobby Russell)  – 5:00
"Pretty Colors" (Al Gorgoni, Chip Taylor)  – 2:35
"Cycles" (Gayle Caldwell) – 3:07
"Wandering" (Caldwell)  – 2:45
"By the Time I Get to Phoenix" (Jimmy Webb)  – 3:55
"Moody River" (Gary D. Bruce)  – 2:33
"My Way of Life" (Bert Kaempfert, Herb Rehbein, Carl Sigman)  – 3:05
"Gentle on My Mind" (John Hartford)  – 3:25

Personnel
 Frank Sinatra - Vocals
 Don Costa - Producer, Arranger, Composer
 Bill Miller - Conductor

In popular culture
In 2022, the song "My Way of Life" was featured in the mid-credits scene of the Moon Knight episode "Gods and Monsters."

References

Frank Sinatra albums
Reprise Records albums
1968 albums
Albums produced by Don Costa
Albums arranged by Don Costa
Albums conducted by Bill Miller (pianist)